Hansford Rowe is a fusion bass guitarist.

Basically a self-taught musician, Rowe started his career in playing bass in a local New York City band in jazz clubs until he met drummer Pierre Moerlen. He moved to France with Moerlen and became a member of Gong, taking part in their transformation into Pierre Moerlen's Gong (PMG) in 1977, playing on their albums Expresso II, Downwind, Live, Time is the Key and Leave It Open. In 1986, he appeared on a re-united PMG album Breakthrough and in 1988 on Second Wind and Full Circle Live '88.

As one of the world’s leading bassists, Rowe has worked with the likes of Mike Oldfield, Allan Holdsworth, John Martyn, Biréli Lagrène, La Monte Young, David “Fuze” Fiuczynski, Gary Husband and many others. He was also responsible for the development of the Warwick “Just Intonation” bass guitar.

In 1994, he was co-founder of Gongzilla with other former PMG members and continues to work with the band.

In 1999 he released a solo album recorded in Quebec and New York City entitled No Other. The album was recorded with compatriot Bon Lozaga (guitar) and other guest musicians. The tour for the album featured singer-songwriter Happy Rhodes.

in 2001, Rowe and Lozaga played on Rhodes' album Find Me, and toured the album in 2004.

In 2013, Rowe played on Karneef's album Love Between Us (Club Roll Records).

Currently performing in HR3 trio, with guitarist Julien Sandiford and drummer Max Lazich, 2011–present.  Plans are to release their debut album in 2013, which was recorded at Piccolo Studio in Montreal, and produced by Denis Savage.

References

http://www.calyx-canterbury.fr/mus/rowe_hansford.html

External links
http://www.hansfordrowe.com
http://www.myspace.com/hansfordrowe
http://www.myspace.com/gongzilla
https://forbassplayersonly.com/interview-hansford-rowe/
https://bassmusicianmagazine.com/2019/06/interview-with-bassist-hansford-rowe/

1954 births
Living people
Musicians from New York City
Canterbury scene
20th-century American bass guitarists
Gong (band) members